Baron Georges Josephus Lamoraldus Maria Gislemus Holvoet (16 August 1874 – 23 April 1967) was a Belgian lawyer and Roman Catholic politician. He was governor of the province of Antwerp from 8 November 1923 until 21 December 1945.

Political career
Georges Holvoet was Chef de Cabinet of the prince regent Prince Charles who reigned in lieu of his older brother Leopold III from 1944 until 1950.

Sources
 Steve Heylen, Bart De Nil, Bart D’hondt, Sophie Gyselinck, Hanne Van Herck en Donald Weber, Geschiedenis van de provincie Antwerpen. Een politieke biografie, Antwerpen, Provinciebestuur Antwerpen, 2005, Vol. 2 p. 104

1874 births
1967 deaths
Governors of Antwerp Province
People from Antwerp Province